Unclejackia is a genus of mosses belonging to the family Brachytheciaceae.

The species of this genus are found in Indonesia. The genus was named for Jack Sharp by botanist Daniel H. Norris.

There are two species:
 Unclejackia crispifolia Ignatov, T.Koponen & Norris, 1999
 Unclejackia longisetula Ignatov, T.Koponen & Norris, 1999

References

Hypnales
Moss genera